This is a list of crust punk bands. Crust punk is a subgenre of punk rock.

References

Crust and d-beat
Lists of hardcore punk bands